DSK Shivajians Football Club (founded as Shivajians Sports Club) was an Indian professional football club based in Pune, Maharashtra. The club was owned by the DSK Group, and competed in the I-League, then top tier of Indian football league system. It has also participated in Pune Football League.

The club was founded as in 1987 in Shivajinagar, Pune, by Ashok Vanjari, Manoj Walvekar, Emanuel Jeevan, Moreshwar Dhumal, Viju Deshmukh and Frank Norman as a platform for entertainment and community engagement for the residents of the locality. The Club have played in the top tier of the Pune Football League since their formation in 1987, and have played the I-League from 2015–16 season. A direct entry into the League, and therefore were immune to relegation until 2018. The club is known for its youth development policy and was the first professional football club in India to have tied up with a major international football club in Liverpool FC, along with whom they run their academy.

History

The early years: 1987–1989 
The club was formed on 6 August 1987, under the name Shivajians Sports Club, by the Late. Ashok Vanjari, Manoj Walvekar, Emanuel Jeevan, Moreshwar (Appa) Dhumal, Viju Deshmukh and Frank Norman. A community club, it served as a platform for competition, entertainment and engagement for locals from the Shivajinagar area in Pune. The club was affiliated with Pune District Football Association.

In 1987 itself, the club organized the first ever All India Floodlight Football Tournament, which was held in Pune in the memory of Shri B. B. Walvekar. Teams such as Central Railway zone – Bombay, Madras Tukes, Bank Of India – Bombay, Sesa Goa, State Bank of India – Hyderabad, Salsete Goa, Kampti Colonies – Nagpur, Bangalore Eleven, Kerala Police and Cochin Customs which were forces to be reckoned with in the country at the time, all participated in the tournament.

Two decades of local dominence: 1990–2010 
From 1990 until 2010, the club had dominated the Pune football scene. In this period, the club won all the prestigious tournaments held in Pune, including the Dr. Hedgewar Football Tournament, Raja Shiv Chhatrapati Football Tournament, Rupmay Chatterjee Football Tournament, Dada Saheb Chavan Memorial Cup and Guru Teg Bahadur Football Tournament. The club also won many state level and all India level football tournaments held in the nearby cities of Kolhapur, Gadhinglaj, Miraj, Indore and Akola.

Staying true to their goal of engaging the community, the Club organised many training programmes and provided scholarships to players from the economically weaker sections of society.

Change of ownership and DSK Shivajians FC: 2010–present 
On 30 April 2010, Shirish Kulkarni, executive director of the DSK Group and former Shivajians SC player, was appointed as the president of the club. This was a prelude to the DSK Group's takeover of the club in 2013, which led to it being renamed as DSK Shivajians FC.

The DSK Group has invested heavily in developing infrastructure for the Club at the DSK Dream City Football Fields in Pune, where they created a state-of-the-art fully residential training facility which also houses the DSK Shivajians FC Academy, which is run in association with Liverpool FC.

In 2013, the Club played the I-League 2nd Division under Coach Pradhyum Reddy, but missed out on the Final Round by a point. They have also participated in the 2016 Durand Cup and reached the semifinals after finishing on top of the Group A with 10 points. Their campaign came to an end after losing to NEROCA FC by 3–0 in the first semifinals.

In 2015, the club got corporate entry into the I-League. Under the coaching of Derrick Pereira, they played in the 2015–2016 I-League Season. In November 2016, Bosnian international Saša Kolunija was roped in as the first foreign signing. They finished 9th on the league table with 15 points.

In the 2016–17 I-League, DSK Shivajians participated for the last time before they pulled out their team and ended on 18 points, finishing on seventh position.

Dissolving the senior team
Shivajians, in existence since 1987, is what the city can, and has, referred to as its legacy team; a team from the grassroots of Pune that went from local division to local division to state and finally to the I-League, India's official premier league of football. Shivajians lasted two seasons in the I-league; 2015-16 and 2016-17 with a seventh place being their highest finish. Then the DSK financial tsunami hit the club and Shivajians could no longer afford to be in the domestic top tier.

Head of the academy, Deggie Cardozo, explains that the motivation of players has continued to remain the same. In his words; "The lads are still training with the same level of intensity and are giving it their all to better their performances, and also the team as a whole."

The club got dissolved in 2017 after announcing their pullout from the 2016–17 I-League Season.

Stadium

The club used Balewadi Sports Complex Stadium as their home ground for the matches of I-League, and Pune Football League. The stadium has a capacity of nearly 10,000 spectators.

The club trained at the DSK Dream City Football Fields in Loni Kalbhor.

Kit manufacturers and shirt sponsors

Notable players
For all current and former notable players of DSK Shivajians with a Wikipedia article, see: DSK Shivajians FC players.

Past internationals
  Kim Song-yong (2014–2015)
  Zohib Islam Amiri (2015–2016)
  Shane McFaul (2016–2017)

Affiliated clubs 
The following club was formerly affiliated with DSK Shivajians:
  Liverpool FC (2013–2015)

Partnership and academy

Liverpool International Football Academy – DSK Shivajians junior

English club Liverpool announced a partnership with DSK Shivajians in India to start their international football academy, with the partnership pertinent in the academy setup only, with academy players trained by coaches representing Liverpool playing for DSK Shivajians U18s. The DSK Shivajians U18 plays in the I-League U18, and the 2014–15 U19 I-League was the first time they were involved in national-level youth team football,Club's U-19 team participated in Maharashtra zone of 2014 I-League U19. partnering Liverpool, and played in the Maharashtra Zone of the league.

DSK Shivajians had its reserve side that participated in the PDFA 1st Division League.

Honours

League
Pune Football League
Champions (Record 22): 1989, 1990, 1991, 1992, 1993, 1994, 1995, 1996, 1997, 1998, 1999, 2000, 2001, 2002, 2003, 2004, 2005, 2006, 2007, 2008, 2008, 2009, 2010, 2016

Cup
B.B. Walvekar All India Floodlight Football Tournament
Champions (1): 1987
Guru Teg Bahadur Football Tournament
Champions (4): 1990, 1992, 1993, 2000
Cantonment Trophy
Runners-up (1): 1990
PCMC Mayor's All India Football Trophy
Third Place (2): 1987, 1989

See also
 Pune Football League
 List of football clubs in Maharashtra
 Sports in Maharashtra

References

Further reading

External links
  (archived on Wayback Machine)
 LFC International Football Academy – DSK Shivajians
 

 
Defunct football clubs in India
Association football clubs established in 1987
Football clubs in Pune
1987 establishments in Maharashtra
2017 disestablishments in India
Association football clubs disestablished in 2017
I-League clubs
I-League 2nd Division clubs